Military College of Engineering may refer to:
 Instituto Militar de Engenharia, Brazil
 Military College of Engineering (Pakistan)
 College of Military Engineering, Pune